KWRB (90.9 FM) is a radio station licensed to Bisbee, Arizona and serves Cochise County Arizona and Northern Sonora Mexico. The station airs a Contemporary Christian music format and is owned by World Radio Network, Inc.

KWRB also airs Christian Talk and Teaching programs including; Insight For Living with Charles Swindoll, Turning Point with David Jeremiah, In Touch with Dr. Charles Stanley, and Focus on the Family.

They also have a repeating station for the Wilcox, Arizona area, with the callsign of K274CB on the 102.7 MHz frequency.

References

External links
 KWRB's official website
 

WRB